Pedro de Matheu (5 June 1900 – 22 April 1965) was a Salvadoran artist. His work was part of the art competition at the 1932 Summer Olympics.

References

1900 births
1965 deaths
Salvadoran artists
Olympic competitors in art competitions
People from Santa Ana, El Salvador